Hipparchia may refer to:

Hipparchia of Maroneia, an ancient Greek philosopher c. 325 BC
Hipparchia (genus), a butterfly genus